108 Sul is a Federal District Metro brazilian station on Orange and Green lines. It was opened on 12 April 2008 and added to the already operating section of the line, from Central to Terminal Samambaia and Ceilândia Sul. It is located between 106 Sul Cine Brasília and 110 Sul.

References

Brasília Metro stations
2008 establishments in Brazil
Railway stations opened in 2008